Carly Simon Collector's Edition is a special edition compilation of Carly Simon songs on three discs in an attractive tin box, released by Madacy Entertainment, on March 31, 2009. 

The thirty songs are selections from Simon's first eleven studio albums released from 1971 to 1983, her Elektra and Warner Brothers years. This compilation was produced and manufactured by Warner Custom Products (a Warner Music Group company) and was marketed and distributed by Madacy Entertainment from St. Laurent, Quebec, Canada. Within the tin box is a cardboard case that holds the three discs, as well as a booklet detailing Simon's career and accomplishments up to the present time. The photographs used on the cover of the tin box, the case cover and within the booklet are by Bob Gothard and are from the liner notes and photo shoot from Simon's 1994 album, Letters Never Sent.

Track listing
Credits adapted from the album's liner notes.

Disc one

Disc 2

Disc 3

Notes
 signifies a writer by additional lyrics

References

External links
 Carly Simon's Official Website

2009 compilation albums
Carly Simon compilation albums
Madacy Entertainment compilation albums